The Great Valley Mill, also known as the Old Grist Mill in the Great Valley, is an historic grist mill which is located in Tredyffrin Township, Chester County, Pennsylvania. 

It was listed on the National Register of Historic Places in 1983.

History and architectural features
Built in 1859, it is a four-story, rectangular, banked, stuccoed, fieldstone structure with a gable roof.

It was listed on the National Register of Historic Places in 1983.

The current building stands on the site of earlier mills, the first dating from 1710. The mill ground flour until the late 20th century, when the flour business was moved to Berks County.

References

Grinding mills on the National Register of Historic Places in Pennsylvania
Industrial buildings completed in 1859
Grinding mills in Chester County, Pennsylvania
National Register of Historic Places in Chester County, Pennsylvania